The 2020–21 Esteghlal Football Club season is the club's 75th season in existence and the 27th consecutive season in the top flight of Iranian football. In addition to the domestic league, Esteghlal participates in this season's editions of the Hazfi Cup, and the AFC Champions League.

Players

First team squad
Last updated:

Transfers

In

Out

Pre-season and friendlies

Competitions

Overview

Persian Gulf Pro League

Standings

Results summary

Results by round

Matches

Score overview

Hazfi Cup

AFC Champions League

Group stage

Statistics

Squad statistics

|-
! colspan="18" style="background:#dcdcdc; text-align:center"| Players transferred/loaned out during the season

Goals
The list is sorted by shirt number when total goals are equal.

Clean sheets

Disciplinary record
Includes all competitive matches. Players with 1 card or more are included only.

See also
 2020–21 Persian Gulf Pro League
 2020–21 Hazfi Cup
 2021 AFC Champions League

Notes

References

External links
 Iran Premier League Statistics
 Persian League

Esteghlal F.C. seasons
Esteghlal